Allelomyia is a genus of flies in the family Tachinidae. It contains only one species, Allelomyia discalis.

References

Further reading

External links

 

Tachinidae
Monotypic Diptera genera